The David Letterman Show is  an American morning talk show that was hosted by David Letterman on NBC. It originally aired from June 23 to October 24, 1980. Originally, the series lasted 90 minutes, then 60 minutes from August 4 onward.

Background
David Letterman's relationship with NBC began in 1978, when he made his first appearance on The Tonight Show Starring Johnny Carson. Over the next two years Letterman would return to the show several times, and would occasionally serve as guest host in Carson's absence. NBC's president Fred Silverman was so impressed by Letterman's performance that he decided to give him a morning talk show.

In early 1980, NBC's daytime morning lineup consisted of six game shows. The David Letterman Show was made possible by the cancellation of three of them: High Rollers, Chain Reaction, and the long-running daytime version of Hollywood Squares.

The series was a critical success but the edgy comedy did not go over well with morning television watchers, who were more accustomed at the time to talk shows, soap operas, game shows, and prime time reruns.

Production
The original producer was Bob Stewart, a veteran quiz-show creator who had enlisted Letterman as a panelist on Pyramid from 1978 onward. However, due to creative differences, Stewart left the show four days before its premiere. He was succeeded by H. Barry Sand, who remained at the helm for the rest of its run and re-joined Letterman for the first five years of Late Night.  Michael McDonald of the Doobie Brothers wrote the opening theme of the show.

Behind the scenes were Hal Gurnee directing and Barry Sand producing, with Biff Henderson serving as stage manager (a role he would serve for the next 35 years of Letterman's career). The writing staff consisted of Merrill Markoe (head writer), Valri Bromfield, Rich Hall, Gary Jacobs, Harold Kimmel, Edie McClurg, Gerard Mulligan, Paul Raley, Ron Richards, and Letterman.

Familiar bits that became staples of Letterman's comedy on his later shows were originally introduced on this show.  They include: "Small Town News", "Stupid Pet Tricks", and an ever-changing non-sequitur opening introduction immediately before Letterman is seen on camera. (e.g., "And now, a man whose recipe for triple fudge brownies includes two quarts of vodka, sauerkraut, and a heaping tablespoon of love...David Letterman!") Because Letterman owned the rights to The David Letterman Show, he was able to claim ownership of all the sketches that originally aired on it; this would prove valuable in 1993, when Letterman left NBC to launch the Late Show on CBS. NBC wanted to claim that much of the work he did on Late Night was the property of NBC, but because those sketches were carryovers from The David Letterman Show, he was allowed to take them to CBS.

The production staff consisted of George Callahan, Kim Carney, Lee B. Chernick, Barbara Gaines, Edd Hall, Tim Holton, Brian J. McAloon, Meg Mortimer, Dency Nelson, and David Reale.

The news producer was Alan Mohan, and the news writer was Nick Allen. Bill Kelley was the technical director. The musical director was Frank Owens who led the "David Letterman Symphony Orchestra" (actually a four-person combo) and traded jokes with Letterman. Longtime NBC newsman Edwin Newman provided live news updates in the studio during each broadcast; studio audience members would often interrupt his reporting with laughter or groans, as if Newman were an anchor on Saturday Night Live'''s "Weekend Update".

The program was produced by Space Age Meats, a precursor to Letterman's later production company, Worldwide Pants Incorporated.

Guests
Valri Bromfield, Edie McClurg, Rich Hall, Gerard Mulligan, Merrill Markoe and Paul Raley all appeared on the show and served as writers. Edd Hall (later the announcer on The Tonight Show with Jay Leno) and Late Show producer Barbara Gaines were both production assistants, while stage manager Biff Henderson and director Hal Gurnee would follow Dave to his next two shows. Announcer/comedian Bob Sarlatte was replaced partway through the run by Bill Wendell, who would also announce on Dave's next two shows until his retirement in 1995.

Among guests who appeared were Steve Allen, Andy Kaufman, Wil Shriner, Richard Lewis, Dinah Shore, Judy Collins, Tom Snyder, photojournalists Jon & Keiko Alpert, keyboardist Suzanne Ciani, Dr. Isaac Asimov and Jeff Greenfield, who reviewed the first show while it was on the air.

The show's musical guests included Tony Award winner Nell Carter, Irene Cara, Tom Rush and Harve Mann, and U2 (where Bono and the Edge famously entered the audience midway through their song "I Will Follow".)

In one of his earliest television appearances, a young Bill Maher was an audience member on the show's first episode, and Conan O'Brien claims he hitchhiked to New York just to see a broadcast in Studio 6A (which has also been home to some of Jack Paar's NBC programs, and then eventually Letterman and O'Brien's versions of the network's Late Night franchise).

Final three weeks
Letterman received notice that his show was being cancelled, but would continue for three more weeks. He decided that if he had three weeks on the air, he was going to have fun with them. He arranged a "Have The David Letterman Show in Your Own Home" contest and chose a family in Cresco, Iowa. He flew in a farmer named Floyd Stiles from Collins, Missouri, with his wife, Zola Mae Stiles, and gave him a "Floyd Stiles Day". Esquire noted, "He cut loose with his own jokes until they had a 2:00 a.m. comedy-club edge. He reached for his emergency weapons. Let go, he let go. By the beginning of October, audiences were packing themselves into the studio." College boys hitched cross-country with petitions to save him. Some Long Island housewives threatened to block Manhattan traffic until the network relented.

For the next year, NBC would pay him $1,000,000 ($20,000 a week) to do nothing except not work for someone else without their permission, which including guest-hosting The Tonight Show Starring Johnny Carson on multiple occasions. Letterman's next program, Late Night premiered on February 1, 1982, replacing Tom Snyder's Tomorrow program.

Episode status
Approximately 83 episodes (of the 90 produced) are held in the archives of Letterman's production company, Worldwide Pants in New York City; a brief clip from the finale was shown on Letterman's 15th anniversary show in 1997, and several episodes were featured as interstitials on the Late Show's'' final episode in 2015. Some episodes are available for on-site viewing at the Paley Center for Media in New York. In 2022, Letterman started releasing interviews from this program (in addition to his later shows) on his official YouTube channel, after longtime Letterman-archivist Don Giller did this on his own fan channel.

References

External links

Opening minutes of the September 30, 1980 show
Detailed Episode Guide for The David Letterman Show

1980 American television series debuts
1980 American television series endings
1980s American television talk shows
English-language television shows
NBC original programming
American live television series
Television series by Universal Television
David Letterman